Sir Thomas Pelham, 2nd Baronet (September 1597 – 1654)  was an English politician who sat in the House of Commons of England  variously between 1621 and 1654. He supported the Parliamentarian cause in the English Civil War.

Pelham was the son of Sir Thomas Pelham, 1st Baronet of Halland in Laughton and his wife Mary Walsingham. He was baptised at East Hoathly on 22 September 1597.     

Pelham was elected Member of Parliament for East Grinstead in 1621 and held the seat to 1622. In 1624 he was elected M.P. for Sussex in the last parliament of King James I and was re-elected in 1625 in the first parliament of King Charles I. He succeeded to the baronetcy of Laughton, Co. Sussex on the death of his father on 2 December 1624. 

In April 1640, Pelham was elected Member of Parliament for Sussex in the Short Parliament. He was re-elected in November 1640 for the Long Parliament and sat until he was secluded under Pride's Purge in 1648. In 1654, he was re-elected with his son among others for Sussex in the First Protectorate Parliament. 

Pelham died at the age of 57 and was buried at Laughton on 28 August 1654.

Pelham married, firstly, Mary Wilbraham, daughter of Sir Roger Wilbraham, Solicitor General for Ireland, and Mary Baber. His second wife was Judith Shurley, widow of John Shurley of Lewes and daughter of Sir Robert Honeywood and Alice Barnham. He married thirdly on 3 June 1640 at Lambeth, London Margaret Vane, daughter of Sir Henry Vane the Elder. His son John succeeded to the baronetcy.

By Mary Wilbraham, he had two sons and four daughters:
Sir John Pelham, 3rd Baronet (1623–1703)
Thomas Pelham (d. 1638), died young
Judith Pelham (d. 1700), married Sir John Monson
Anne Pelham (d. c.1644)
Jane Pelham (d. 1635)
Elizabeth Pelham, married Henry Pelham of Lincolnshire

He had no surviving children by Judith Shurley, but one son and one daughter by Margaret survived him:
Sir Nicholas Pelham (c.1650–1739)
Philadelphia Pelham, married Francis Howard, 5th Baron Howard of Effingham

References

1597 births
1654 deaths
Baronets in the Baronetage of England
Thomas
English MPs 1621–1622
English MPs 1624–1625
English MPs 1625
English MPs 1640 (April)
English MPs 1640–1648
English MPs 1654–1655
People from East Hoathly